The Gunderam Defense, also known as the Brazilian Defense or the Câmara Defense if followed by moves ...g6, ...Bg7 and ...Nf6, creating the typical King's Indian formation, is a rarely played chess opening starting with the moves:

1. e4 e5
2. Nf3 Qe7

It is named after chess player and theoretician , though Hélder Câmara played it 4 years prior to Gunderam.

History
The opening was first played by International Master Hélder Câmara in 1954, in the IV Centennial of the City of São Paulo Tournament and the XXII Brazilian Chess Championship.

Gunderam played it for the first time in a correspondence match against August Babel in 1958 and published an analysis of it in his book Neue Eröffnungswege, in 1961. He named this defense "Damenverteidigung" ("Queen Defence"), whose main line would be 1. e4 e5 2.Nf3 Qe7 3.Nc3 c6 4.Bc4 f5. He also analyzed a sharp line characterized by the moves: 1.e4 e5 2.Nf3 Qe7 3.Bc4 f5 4.exf5 d5 5.Bxd5 Nf6 6.Bb3 Bxf5.

In 1969, Washington de Oliveira published a work dedicated to the analysis of Câmara's use of the opening, called Notas Sobre a Defesa Brasileira ("Annotations on the Brazilian Defense").

Overview
Although 2...Qe7 does answer the threat against Black's e-pawn, it interferes with the development of Black's dark-square bishop. One of the ideas behind this awkward queen move is to unbalance the game by castling queenside while White will presumably castle kingside.

Whereas Gunderam's suggestion was the f7-f5 break, as a delayed Latvian Gambit, Câmara's intent was to allow the use of the King's Indian setup against King's Pawn opening, proceeding with ...g6, ...Bg7 and ...Nf6 after 2...Qe7. It became popular among Brazilian players then, so much so they begun calling it "the Brazilian defense", being employed often in the top national competition the following years. Later on, Hélder Câmara requested that it be called "Camara Defense" instead.

Notable Games
August Babel vs Gerhart Gunderam, Germany (corr), 1958

See also
List of chess openings
List of chess openings named after people

References 

Chess openings
1958 in chess